Chlorogalum grandiflorum is a species of flowering plant known by the common name Red Hills soap plant. It is endemic to the Sierra Nevada foothills, such as the Red Hills (Tuolumne County), of California, where it grows in chaparral, woodland, and forest.

Description
This uncommon perennial wildflower grows from a red or brown-coated bulb up to 7 centimeters wide. The basal leaves have very wavy edges. The inflorescence may be a meter long and is composed of many flowers, each with six tepals which are white with a purple midvein. The tepals are narrow, up to 3 centimeters long, and curl back as they spread open. Each ephemeral flower opens in the evening and closes by the following morning. There are six stamens tipped with yellow anthers. The fruit is a capsule just over half a centimeter long.

References

External links
Calflora Database: Chlorogalum grandiflorum (Red Hills soaproot)
Jepson Manual eFlora (TJM2) treatment of Chlorogalum grandiflorum
USDA Plants Profile for Chlorogalum grandiflorum
Flora of North America
UC Photos gallery — Chlorogalum grandiflorum

grandiflorum
Endemic flora of California
Flora of the Sierra Nevada (United States)
Natural history of the California chaparral and woodlands
Natural history of El Dorado County, California
Natural history of Placer County, California
Natural history of Tuolumne County, California